George E. Marshall (December 29, 1891 – February 17, 1975) was an American actor, screenwriter, producer, film and television director, active through the first six decades of film history.

Relatively few of Marshall's films are well-known today, with Destry Rides Again (1939), The Ghost Breakers (1940), The Blue Dahlia (1946), The Sheepman (1958), and How the West Was Won (1962) being the biggest exceptions. John Houseman called him "one of the old maestros of Hollywood ... he had never become one of the giants but he held a solid and honorable position in the industry."

In the 1930s, he established a reputation for comedy, directing Laurel and Hardy in three classic films, and also working on a variety of comedies for Fox, though many of his films at Fox were destroyed in a vault fire in 1937. Later in his career he was particularly sought after for comedies. He did around half a dozen films each with Bob Hope and Jerry Lewis, and also worked with W. C. Fields, Jackie Gleason, and Will Rogers.

Biography

Early life
Marshall dropped out of the University of Chicago and worked a journalist and a mechanic. He was working as a logger in Washington when he decided to go to Los Angeles in 1912 to visit his mother.
Marshall served in France in World War I.

Marshall decided to return to Hollywood and work in the movies. He initially worked as an extra. He and another extra, future director Frank Lloyd, once pooled their money to buy a suit and get more work. Marshall eventually moved into stunt work, then directing.

Harry Carey and Neal Hart
Marshall's early directorial work most starred Harry Carey and Neal Hart. He said his first film was the Carey three reeler The Committee on Credentials (1916). He also directed Love's Lariat (1916) and A Woman's Eyes (1917), all with Carey, and The Man from Montana (1917) with Hart. He worked with other actors too, such as Hoot Gibson in The Midnight Flyer (1918) and Ruth Roland in the serials The Adventures of Ruth (1919) and Ruth of the Rockies (1920).

Tom Mix
In the early 1920s Marshall directed a series of movies starring Tom Mix including Prairie Trails (1920). For most of the 1920s Marshall directed short films, notably at Fox. In the mid 1920s he was appointed general supervisor of Fox comedy shorts. His credits included A Flaming Affair with Lex Neal.

Laurel and Hardy
Marshall directed a series of Laurel and Hardy films including Pack Up Your Troubles (1932), Their First Mistake (1932), and Towed in a Hole (1932).  He also played a menacing, vengeful chef in Pack Up Your Troubles, and made a brief appearance in Their First Mistake.

Fox Films
Marshall took a long-term contract at Fox where his films included Wild Gold (1934) and two with Alice Faye, She Learned About Sailors (1934) and 365 Nights in Hollywood (1934).

Fox entrusted him with one of the studio's biggest stars, Will Rogers in Life Begins at 40 (1935). He did a comedy, $10 Raise (1935), and a musical with Faye, Music Is Magic (1935).

Marshall stayed with Fox when it merged with 20th Century to become 20th Century-Fox. He did a crime film, Show Them No Mercy! (1935), a Jane Withers vehicle Can This Be Dixie? (1936), and a war film with Barbara Stanwyck and Wallace Beery, A Message to Garcia (1936).

After another crime film, The Crime of Dr. Forbes (1936) he did Nancy Steele Is Missing! (1937) with Victor McLaglen, Love Under Fire (1937) with Loretta Young and Battle of Broadway (1938) with McLaglen.

Universal
Sam Goldwyn borrowed Marshall to direct The Goldwyn Follies (1938).

Marshall went to Universal where he directed W. C. Fields in You Can't Cheat an Honest Man (1939). Then he had a huge success with Marlene Dietrich and James Stewart in Destry Rides Again (1939). He did another Western at Universal, When the Daltons Rode (1940).

Marshall went to Paramount, where he directed Bob Hope and Paulette Goddard in a successful horror-comedy The Ghost Breakers (1940).

Marshall, Goddard and Stewart made Pot o' Gold (1941) for United Artists. Then Marshall went to Columbia for Texas (1941) with Glenn Ford and William Holden, and RKO for Valley of the Sun (1942) with Lucille Ball. During the making of the latter he celebrated his 25th year in films. By the early 1940s he was best known as a director of Westerns.

Paramount
Paramount were delighted with The Ghost Breakers and offered Marshall a long-term contract. He did The Forest Rangers (1942) with Goddard and Fred MacMurray and directed the studio's all-star Star Spangled Rhythm (1942).

Marshall was among the studio's leading directors by now. He worked with Dorothy Lamour and Dick Powell in Riding High (1943), and Mary Martin in True to Life (1943). He did And the Angels Sing (1944) with Lamour, MacMurray and the new star Betty Hutton, then did a comedy with MacMurray Murder, He Says (1945).

Marshall did a biopic of Texas Guinan starring Hutton, Incendiary Blonde (1945), then a comedy with Eddie Bracken and Veronica Lake, Hold That Blonde (1945).

Marshall had a big success with The Blue Dahlia (1946), starring Alan Ladd and Lake, from a script by Raymond Chandler.

Also popular was a comedy he made with Bob Hope, Monsieur Beaucaire (1946), and one with Hutton, The Perils of Pauline (1947), a tribute to the old serials that Marshall himself used to direct; it was produced by Sol Siegel.

Paramount got him to do another revue-style film, Variety Girl (1947).

In 1946 Sight and Sound magazine said Marshall had become:
One of our leading directors of comedy. Not comedy of ideas, however fuzzy or pretentious as with Preston Sturges, the "art" comedy. But showmanship, the Paramount, the Hollywood romantic comedy... of recent years had become so syrupy, plotty and ungay. Marshall has not remodelled the form or made drastic changes. But he has lightened it, sped it up, taken stories that would have remained solemn bores with more literal minded directors and made entertainment out of them, by having a little fun,  going just a little wild in the process... With a style that is extroverted, clean, limber, above all natural, casual in its use of slapstick with the effect of making Sturges' slapstick seem almost studied, Marshall, you'll probably find, is the director credit that will explain how many a film with all the external attributes of a stinker... kept you in your seat, interested to the end, as it were, in spite of yourself.
Marshall did a comedy with Goddard and MacDonald Carey, Hazard (1948), then he was borrowed by Walter Wanger for Tap Roots (1948) starring Susan Hayward.

In 1948 he quit Bonanza (which became Lust for Gold) with Glenn Ford and Ida Lupino after four days of filming due to disputes with producer S. Sylvan Simon. However he bounced back with My Friend Irma (1949) which introduced Martin and Lewis.

In 1949 Paramount extended its contract with him for two more years. He was reunited with Ball and Hope in Fancy Pants (1950), then did two with MacMurray, Never a Dull Moment (1950) at RKO and A Millionaire for Christy (1951) at Fox.

In 1950 Marshall and William Holden announced they had formed a company to make half hour TV shows but it appears they were not made.

Back at Paramount he did The Savage (1952) with Charlton Heston, Off Limits (1953) with Hope and Mickey Rooney, and Scared Stiff (1953) with Martin and Lewis (remaking his earlier Ghost Breakers) .

He did a biopic, Houdini (1953) with Tony Curtis, then Money from Home (1954) with Martin and Lewis, and Red Garters (1954) with Rosemary Clooney.

Marshall went to South Africa to make Duel in the Jungle (1954) then back at Paramount remade his own Destry Rides Again as Destry (1954) with Audie Murphy.

Freelance
Marshall went to Universal to do a musical, The Second Greatest Sex (1955), and a Western, Pillars of the Sky (1956). He returned to Africa to make Beyond Mombassa (1956) with Cornel Wilde for Columbia.

Also at Columbia he made The Guns of Fort Petticoat (1957) with Audie Murphy, produced by Murphy.

He went back to Paramount to make The Sad Sack (1957), Jerry Lewis' second film without Dean Martin.

Glenn Ford
Marshall then received an offer from MGM, who were then being run by Sol Siegel, to direct Glenn Ford in a Western, The Sheepman (1958). It was a hit, so he stayed at the studio to direct Imitation General (1959), with Ford; The Mating Game (1959) with Debbie Reynolds; and It Started with a Kiss (1959) and The Gazebo (1959), both with Reynolds and Ford. All these films were popular.

Marshall and Ford made Cry for Happy (1961) at Columbia, which featured location filming in Japan. He announced plans to make a biopic of Ruth Roland with Debbie Reynolds but it was not made.

Then Marshall directed Rita Hayworth in The Happy Thieves (1963) and directed the railroad segment of MGM's epic How the West Was Won (1963) in Cinerama.

In 1963 he celebrated his fiftieth year as a director. "You try to keep up with the spirit of the times", he said. ""You go along with it or wonder why they don't call you any more... Some of my friends have let the world go by them. They couldn't understand the changes... I don't think people have basically changed. They still want to be entertained."

Marshall said his credo was "you should see possibilities and they lead you to other things later on. If you're a mechanic you just do it as written. If you're – I wouldn't say an artist – then you try to make more of it. It's easy to be a mechanic."

Marshall did Papa's Delicate Condition (1963) with Jackie Gleason, Dark Purpose (1964) with Shirley Jones and Advance to the Rear (1964) with Ford. He also did the pilot for Daniel Boone.

Later career
In the late 1960s Marshall moved increasingly into television.

His later feature credits include two with Hope, Boy, Did I Get a Wrong Number! (1966) and Eight on the Lam (1967) and The Wicked Dreams of Paula Schultz (1968) with Elke Sommer.

His last feature that he directed was Hook, Line & Sinker (1969) starring Lewis.

Lucille Ball chose George Marshall to direct eleven episodes of her Here's Lucy television series in 1969, having previously worked in several Marshall comedies herself.

He appeared as an actor in The Crazy World of Julius Vrooder in 1974, his last feature film.

His last professional job was an acting appearance in Police Woman. Three days before he died he was inducted into the Academy of Motion Picture Arts and Sciences Hall of Fame.

Personal life
Marshall married Germaine, who he met in France after World War I. They had two children, a son and a daughter.

Marshall died after a two-week illness. He is buried in Holy Cross Cemetery in Culver City, Los Angeles.

For his contribution to the film industry, George Marshall has a star on the Hollywood Walk of Fame at 7048 Hollywood Boulevard.

Partial filmography

And the Best Man Won (1915) (short) – story
Across the Rio Grande (1916) (short) – writer, director – with Neal Hart
The Committee on Credentials (1916) (short) – director – with Harry Carey
Liberty (1916) (serial) – assistant director
Love's Lariat (1916) – writer, director – with Harry Carey, Neal Hart
A Woman's Eyes (1916) - writer, director – with Harry Carey
The Devil's Own (1916) – director
Won by Grit (1917) – director
The Comeback (1917) (short) – director, producer
They Were Four (1917) (short) – writer, director – with Joe Rickson
Border Wolves (1917) (short) – story, director – with Neal Hart
Roped In (1917) – story, director – with Neal Hart
The Raid (1917) – writer, director – with Neal Hart
The Desert Ghost (1917) – director
Bill Brennan's Claim (1917) – director
Casey's Border Raid (1917) – story, director – with Neal Hart
The Honor of Men (1917) – director
Swede Hearts (1917) – story, director – with Neal Hart
Meet My Wife (1917) – story, director – with Neal Hart
Double Suspicion (1917) – story, director – with Neal Hart
Right of Way Casey (1917) – story, director – with Neal Hart
Squaring It (1917) – story, director – with Neal Hart
The Ninth Day (1917) – director
The Man from Montana (1917) – story, director – with Neal Hart
Quick Triggers (1918) (short) – director, writer – with Neal Hart
The Midnight Flyer (1918) (short) – director – with Hoot Gibson
Naked Fists (1918) (short) – director, writer – with Neal Hart
Beating the Limited (1918) (short) – director, story – with Neal Hart
When Paris Saw Green Red (1918) (short) – director
The Fast Mail (1919) (short) – director
The Husband Hunter (1919) – director
The Gun Runners (1919) – director, story
The Adventures of Ruth (1919) (serial) – director – with Ruth Roland
Charlot! Charlot! (1919) – director
Ruth of the Rockies (1920) (serial) – director – with Ruth Roland
Prairie Trails (1920) – director - with Tom Mix
Why Trust Your Husband?  (1921) – director, story
Hands Off! (1921) – director – with Tom Mix
A Ridin' Romeo (1921) – director, story – with Tom Mix
After Your Own Heart (1921) – director – with Tom Mix
The Lady from Longacre (1921) – director
 The Jolt (1921) – director, writer – with Edna Murphy
Smiles Are Trumps (1922) – director
West Is West (1922) (short) – director
The Haunted Valley (1923) – director
Don Quickshot of the Rio Grande (1923) – director
 Where is This West? (1923) – director
Men in the Raw (1923) – director
The Back Trail (1924) – director
The Fight (1924) (short) – director
The Hunt (1924) (short) – director
The Race (1924) (short) – director
Paul Jones Jr (1924) (short) – director
The Burglar (1924) (short) – director
All Abroad (1925) (short) – producer
A Spanish Romeo (1925) (short) – director
The Big Game Hunter (1925) (short) – director
The Sky Jumper (1925) (short) – director
A Parisian Knight (1925) (short) – director
Neptune's Stepdaughter (1925) (short) – supervisor
Pawnshop Politics (1926) (short) – producer
Matrimony Blues (1926) (short) – producer
A Bankrupt Honeymoon (1926) (short) – supervisor
From a Cabby's Seat (1926) (short) – director
Moving Day (1926) (short) – supervisor
The Steeplechaser (1926) (short) – producer
King of the Kitchen (1926) (short) – producer
A1 Society (1926) (short) – supervisor
The Non-Stop Bride (1926) (short) – supervisor
The Battling Kangaroo (1926) (short) – supervisor
Golf Widows (1926) (short) – supervisor
A Trip to Chinatown (1926) – production supervisor
Girls (1927) (short) – director
A Dog's Pal (1927) (short) – production supervisor
The Kangaroo Detective (1927) (short) – production supervisor
A Man About Town (1927) (short) – director, producer
Wine, Women and Sauerkraut (1927) (short) – production supervisor
Rumors for Rent (1927) (short) – production supervisor
Suite Homes (1927) (short) – production supervisor
The Gay Retreat (1927) (short) – production supervisor
Gentlemen Prefer Scotch (1927) (short) – director
Slippery Silks (1927) (short) – producer
The Adventures of Ruth (1927) (short) – director
Twenty Legs Under the Sea (1927) (short) – supervisor
Captain Kidd's Kittens (1927) (short) – supervisor
The Elephant's Elbows (1928) (short) – supervisor
Bear Knees (1928) (short) – supervisor
No Picnic (1928) (short) – director
No Sale Smitty (1928) (short) – director
Camping Out (1928) (short) – director
No Vacation (1929) (short) – director
Circus Time (1929) (short) – director
No Children (1929) (short) – director
Watch My Smoke (1929) (short) – director
Tomato Omlette (1929) (short) – director
Puckered Success (1929) (short) – director
Uncle's Visit (1929) (short) – director 
Hey Diddle Diddle (1930) (short) – director, writer – with Nick Basil
He Loved Her Not (1931) (short) – director
How I Play Golf (1931) – series of 12 shorts starring Bobby Jones – director
Big Dame Hunting (1932) (short) – director, story – with Ned Sparks
Just a Pain in the Parlor (1932) (short) – director
Strictly Unreliable (1932) (short) – director
The Old Bull (1932) (short) – director
 Pack Up Your Troubles (1932) (short) – director, actor
Allum and Eve (1932) (short) – director
A Firehouse Honeymoon (1932) (short) – director
 Their First Mistake (1932) (short) – director – with Laurel and Hardy
 Towed in a Hole (1932) (short) – director, idea – with Laurel and HardyEasy on the Eyes (1933) (short) – directorCalienete Love (1933) (short) – directorSweet Cookie (1933) (short) – directorKnock Out Kisses (1933) (short) – directorHusbands' Reunion (1933) (short) – directorThe Big Fibber (1933) (short) – directorHow to Break 90 (1933) – a series of 6 shorts starring Bobby Jones – directorOlsen's Big Moment (1933) – story
 365 Nights in Hollywood (1934) – director – with Alice Faye
 She Learned About Sailors (1934) – director – with Alice Faye
 Wild Gold (1934) – directorCall It Luck (1934) – story
 Ever Since Eve (1934) – director
 Life Begins at 40 (1935) – director
 In Old Kentucky (1935) – director
 Show Them No Mercy! (1935) – director
 Music is Magic (1935) – director
 $10 Raise (1935) – director
 A Message to Garcia (1936) – director
 The Crime of Dr. Forbes (1936) – director
 Love Under Fire (1937) – director
 Can This Be Dixie? (1937) – director, story
 Nancy Steele Is Missing! (1937) – director
 Hold That Co-ed (1938) – director
 Battle of Broadway (1938) – director
 The Goldwyn Follies (1938) – director
 You Can't Cheat an Honest Man (1939) – director
 Destry Rides Again (1939) – director
 The Ghost Breakers (1940) – director
 When the Daltons Rode (1940) – director
 Pot o' Gold (1941) – director
 Texas (1941) – director
 Star Spangled Rhythm (1942) – director
 Valley of the Sun (1942) – director
 The Forest Rangers (1942) – director
 True to Life (1943) – director
 Riding High (1943) – director
 And the Angels Sing (1944) – director
 Murder, He Says (1945) – director
 Hold That Blonde (1945) – director
 Incendiary Blonde (1945) – director
 The Blue Dahlia (1946) – director
 Monsieur Beaucaire (1946) – director
 The Perils of Pauline (1947) – director
 Variety Girl (1947) – director, cameo
 Hazard (1948) – director
 Tap Roots (1948) – directorLust for Gold (1949) – directed for a few days before leaving film
 My Friend Irma (1949) – director
 Never a Dull Moment (1950) – director
 Fancy Pants (1950) – director
 Ace of Clubs (1951) (short) – director with Bobby Jones
 A Millionaire for Christy (1951) – director
 The Savage (1952) – director
 Off Limits (1952) – director
 Money from Home  (1953) – director
 Scared Stiff (1953) – director
 Houdini (1953) – director
 Duel in the Jungle (1954) – director
 Red Garters (1954) – director
 Destry (1954) – director
 The Second Greatest Sex (1955) – directorScreen Directors Playhouse (1955) (TV series) – director, story – 1 episode "The Silent Partner" with Buster KeatonCavalcade of America (1955) (TV series) – actor episode "How to Raise a Boy"
 Beyond Mombasa (1956) – director
 Pillars of the Sky (1956) – director
 The Guns of Fort Petticoat (1957) – director
 The Sad Sack (1957) – director
 The Sheepman (1958) – director
 Imitation General (1958) – director
 The Mating Game (1959) – director
 It Started with a Kiss (1959) – director
 The Gazebo (1959) – director
 Cry for Happy (1961) – director
 The Happy Thieves (1961) – director
 How the West Was Won (1962) – director (the railroad scenes)
 Papa's Delicate Condition (1963) – director
 Advance to the Rear (1964) – director
 Dark Purpose (1964) – directorValentine's Day (1964–65) (TV series) – director 5 episodesThe Wackiest Ship in the Army (1964) (TV series) – director 1 episodeDaniel Boone (1964–70) (TV series) – director 10 episodes
 Boy, Did I Get a Wrong Number! (1966) – directorTarzan (1966) (TV series) – director 1 episode
 Eight on the Lam (1967) – director
 The Wicked Dreams of Paula Schultz (1968) – director
 Hook, Line & Sinker (1969) – directorHere's Lucy (1969) (TV series) – director 10 episodes – actor in episode "Lucy Runs the Rapids"Cade's County (1972) (TV series) – director 1 episodeHec Ramsey (1972) (TV series) – director 1 episodeThe Odd Couple (1972) (TV series) – director 2 episodesThe Crazy World of Julius Vrooder (1974) – actorPolice Woman'' (1975) (TV series) – actor in episode "Blast"

Awards and nominations

References

External links

 
 
 

1891 births
1975 deaths
Military personnel from Illinois
American military personnel of World War I
American film directors
American male film actors
American male television actors
Presidents of the Directors Guild of America
Male actors from Chicago
Film producers from Illinois
American male silent film actors
American male screenwriters
American television directors
Silent film directors
Western (genre) film directors
Deaths from pneumonia in California
Burials at Holy Cross Cemetery, Culver City
20th-century American male actors
Screenwriters from Illinois
20th-century American male writers
20th-century American screenwriters